Eighty-two annual State of the Nation Addresses (SONA) have been delivered since 1935 by fourteen presidents of the Philippines.

History
Prior to the introduction of the SONA, similar speeches were given by Philippine presidents. The precursor of the SONA was the State of the Katipunan Address held on March 22, 1897, by Andres Bonifacio, who is considered by some to be the first president of the Philippines. Emilio Aguinaldo, officially recognized as the first president of the Philippines, held a State of the Revolutionary Nation Address on September 15, 1898, after opening the Malolos Congress entitled Mensaje Leido por el Presidente del Govierno Revolucionario para el Congreso. On June 16, 1936, Manuel L. Quezon held a State of the Commonwealth Government Affairs at the inaugural session of the National Assembly.

The first SONA was made by Manuel L. Quezon in 1935 before the National Assembly. Among those who made a SONA, Ferdinand Marcos made twenty SONAs - the largest number made by a single president. Sergio Osmeña in contrast made just one. Among the officially recognized presidents two presidents did not make a single SONA - Emilio Aguinaldo and José P. Laurel. Marcos was the only one who did not deliver a SONA before the Congress (1973, 1974, 1975, 1976, and 1977). Elpidio Quirino's 1950 speech was delivered through radio broadcast when he was confined at the Johns Hopkins Hospital in Baltimore, Maryland in the United States.

The SONA is traditionally held annually. The presidential speech has been delivered in English until 2009 when it was last delivered in the said language. Benigno Aquino III was the first president to deliver the presidential speech in Filipino. He used Filipino in all of his six speeches from 2010 to 2015.

The longest speech was made by Ferdinand Marcos in 1969, with a total of 29,335 words. In contrast, Gloria Macapagal Arroyo's speech made in 2005 was the shortest, with only 1,551 words.

List of State of the Nation Addresses

References

External links
State of the Nation Addresses - Official Gazette of the Republic of the Philippines